Smiley is a 2012 American slasher film directed by Michael Gallagher and made by Level 10 Films. The film stars Caitlin Gerard, Melanie Papalia, Keith David, Shane Dawson, Andrew James Allen, Toby Turner, and Liza Weil. The film was released on October 12, 2012, to largely negative reviews.

Plot
The plot revolves around the titular Smiley killer, the subject of an Internet myth. Supposedly, if a person on a Chatroulette-style website types the phrase "I did it for the lulz" three times, their chat partner will be murdered by a killer called Smiley (so named because he mutilated his own face by stitching his own eyes shut and carved his mouth into a smile) before they themselves are killed.

A college student named Ashley (Gerard) becomes roommates with Proxy (Papalia). Ashley decides to go to a party where she meets Zane (Allen), Mark (Turner) and Binder (Dawson), who is mocked by his classmates for having reported a case of pedophilia, earning him the nickname Pedobear.

One night Ashley and Proxy test out the Smiley myth with a random person online. After typing "I did it for the lulz" three times, to their horror, the stranger is murdered. Proxy convinces Ashley to stay silent. However, Ashley begins experiencing guilt over the stranger's death. She also begins to believe that Smiley is stalking her and intends to kill her; her friends and a psychiatrist write this off as anxious hallucinations and nightmares. Ashley eventually goes to the police; there she tries to convince them, to no avail, to investigate the murders caused by Smiley. The police dismiss her, implying that she is going crazy and quite possibly on the receiving end of a large, elaborate prank.

When Proxy loses contact with Zane, she video chats Ashley in hysterics. Ashley goes to his house to check on him, only to find him shot dead with a handgun he purchased for self-defense. Instead of calling the police, Ashley picks up the gun and orders Proxy to type "I did it for the lulz" three times, hoping to ambush and kill Smiley. However, she accidentally shoots Binder, who had been coming over to check on her. Moments later, Smiley appears and slits Binder's throat. Ashley is then attacked by multiple Smileys, finally throwing herself out a window to her presumed death to escape them.

It is then revealed that Ashley's classmates, including Proxy, Binder, and the babysitter murdered in the opening, are all part of a fringe group of Anonymous. They created the Smiley myth as a large-scale prank, although they are satisfied with Ashley's death. Binder states that Smiley will likely live on long after them and inspire copycat killings.

Later, Proxy is video-chatting with Zane, questioning their morality. Zane dismisses her worries and types "I did it for the lulz" three times as a joke. However, a real Smiley appears behind Proxy, kills her, and then waves at Zane via webcam as he watches on in pure horror.

In a post-credits scene, Ashley unexpectedly wakes up and gasps loudly, revealing that she survived her fall.

Cast
 Caitlin Gerard as Ashley 
 Melanie Papalia as Proxy
 Shane Dawson as Binder
 Andrew James Allen as Zane
 Liza Weil as Dr. Jenkins
 Toby Turner as Mark
 Roger Bart as Professor Clayton
 Keith David as Diamond
 Patrick O'Sullivan as Cooper
 Nikki Limo as Stacy
 Jason Horton as Flasher
 Bree Essrig as Kim
 Darrien Skylar as Mary
 Michael Traynor as Smiley

Production and release

Gallagher began working on Smiley after performing in some episodes of the Totally Sketch series on YouTube. As he was producing the film himself, Smiley had a small budget and Gallagher was active in various different parts of the film such as advertising and seeking MPAA approval. Gallagher initially debated using stockings with a smiley face painted on it as Smiley's mask, but discarded the idea because it "just wasn't scary enough". He chose to go with the final mask after imagining a "guy who stitched an emoticon into his own face and thought, 'Wow, that's really creepy. Theatrical rights for the film were purchased by AMC Theatres who gave the film a limited screening on their independent platform on October 12, 2012.

The film played in select AMC theaters throughout the United States, with fans able to request to host screenings of Smiley in their cities via Tugg.

Reaction from 4chan and Anonymous
Prior to the film's official theatrical release, Gallagher and his family began receiving threats from people alleging to be from 4chan and Anonymous. Personal information for Gallagher, his family, and anyone that had worked on Smiley was posted online with the recommendation that people use it to harass them. In an interview with Fearnet, Gallagher stated that the site had posted the information as part of "Operation Fuck Smiley" and that "Their goal was to spoil the end of the movie, post pornography and gore on any website that talks about it, rate the movie really low... it was this horrible vendetta, like they wanted to destroy it because we talked about 4chan in the movie." The validity of these claims were questioned by Cole Strycker, author of Epic Win for Anonymous, who expressed suspicion that Gallagher was trying to use the death threats as a publicity stunt to promote the film. In response, Gallagher asserted that the death threats were real and were not being used as a publicity stunt.

Reception

The film received largely negative reviews and holds an 18% rating on Rotten Tomatoes based on an average rating of 3.5/10 based on 22 reviews; several reviews called the film a "rip off" of Scream and Candyman. Criticism centered on claims of the film being "dull" or "generic", with additional criticisms over the acting performances and lack of originality. Smiley also received negative reviews from The A.V. Club and The New York Times.

Bloody Disgusting panned the film, stating that the writers "took a strong, modern idea, over-thought it and turned it into a generic '90s movie that'll have you throwing popcorn at the screen". Variety called the film "uninspired", saying that "the mayhem here is neither especially gory nor suspenseful". Mark Olsen of the Los Angeles Times gave a more positive review, calling the film a "more or less satisfying low-key creeper". Olsen praised Gerard, Weil, David, and Bart's performances, but called the story-telling "repetitive".

References

External links
 
 
 
 

2012 films
2012 horror films
2012 independent films
2010s psychological horror films
2010s serial killer films
2010s slasher films
2010s teen horror films
American independent films
American psychological horror films
American slasher films
American teen horror films
Films shot in California
Films based on urban legends
Films about the Internet
Films about social media
Supernatural slasher films
2010s English-language films
Films directed by Michael J. Gallagher
2010s American films